Doryssa is a genus of freshwater snails which have an operculum, aquatic gastropod mollusks in the family Pachychilidae.

Distribution 
These freshwater snails are endemic to South America.

Species 
Species within the genus Doryssa include:
 Doryssa atra (Bruguière, 1792)
 Doryssa brevior (Troschel, 1848) - type species of the genus Doryssa
 Doryssa consolidata (Bruguière, 1790)
 Doryssa derivans Brot, 1874
 Doryssa geijskesi (Pain, 1956)
 Doryssa gruneri (Jonas, 1844)
 Doryssa hohenackeri (Philippi, 1851)
 Doryssa kappleri (Vernhout, 1914)
 Doryssa lamarckiana (Brot, 1870)
 Doryssa petechialis (Brot, 1860)
 Doryssa schuppi (Ihering, 1902)
 Doryssa transversa (Lea, 1850)

References

External links 

Doryssa
Freshwater snails
Gastropod genera